The Wait is the debut album by Canadian country music artist Tebey. It was released on December 4, 2012 via Road Angel Entertainment. Tebey produced the album with Jason Barry. They were nominated for Record Producer(s) of the Year at the 2013 Canadian Country Music Association Awards for their work on the album. The single "Somewhere in the Country" peaked at number 80 on the Billboard Canadian Hot 100.

Critical reception
Noah Siegel of New Canadian Music wrote that the tracks are "earnest and as tightly crafted as any modern country gets."

Track listing

Chart performance

Singles

References

2012 debut albums
Tebey albums